Yitzchak (Irving) Breitowitz is an American-born Orthodox Jewish rabbi, lecturer and rabbinic authority. The Rabbi Emeritus of Woodside Synagogue Ahavas Torah, and the Rav of Kehillas Ohr Somayach, and lecturer at Ohr Somayach in Jerusalem.

Family background
Breitowitz was born in April 1954 in New York, to David (July 15, 1918 - August 22, 2003 age 85) and Chaya Esther Tzipora (Helen) Breitowitz (Rakoszynski) (March 31, 1921 - March 4, 2014 age 92). Both were Holocaust survivors

Early life and education

R' Breitowitz was born in New York and grew up in the Greater Hartford, Connecticut area where he attended Yeshiva of Hartford. Later he attended Ner Israel Yeshiva in Baltimore, MD.
In his time in Ner Israel, Rabbi Breitowitz became a close disciple of the Rosh Yeshiva R' Yitzchak Ruderman, and future Roshei Yeshiva R' Yaakov Weinberg, and Yaakov Moshe Kulefsky. 
He received his bachelor of Arts from Johns Hopkins University and his Juris Doctor at Harvard Law School in 1979, where he graduated magna cum laude. In 1979 He obtained rabbinic ordination from Ner Israel Rabbinical College.

Career

After graduating R' Breitowitz worked in private practice in Chicago where he also served as law clerk for the Honorable Susan Getzendanner of the U.S. District Court for the northern district of Illinois and taught at the Chicago-Kent College of Law and at the University of Illinois.

R' Breitowitz returned to Baltimore in 1983, where he joined the faculty of the University of Maryland School of Law, as an associate professor of law, specializing in bankruptcy, commercial law and bioethics. In 2001 Breitowitz was awarded as "Outstanding Teacher of the Year" by the Maryland University.

In 1988 R' Breitowitz became the Rabbi of the Woodside Synagogue Ahavas Torah in Silver Spring, Maryland where he served for 22 years. In Baltimore he lectured regularly to the larger Washington community at the Board of Jewish Education, the JCC, the UJA-Federation and other venues and has also taught at the Girls’ Division of the Yeshiva High School.

In April 2010 Breitowitz moved to Israel where he became a senior lecturer in Ohr Somayach, Jerusalem and the Rav of Kehillas Ohr Somayach.  Breitowitz is also a lecturer at Yiboneh as well as a member of the Faculty at the Tikvah Fund.

Written work and lectures

Breitowitz has lectured on medical, business, and family ethics. He has written and published on the interface of Halacha and contemporary society with a special interest and expertise in medical, family, business, and legal ethics. His articles Discuss topics such as stem cell research, cloning, organ donation, land for peace, and the Jewish perspectives on war and gun control. He has also written many basic source books on Jewish values for NCSY, an organization that does Jewish outreach to teenagers.

Personal life

Breitowitz is married to Sally Naiman.

Published articles

"Between Civil and Religious Law: The Plight of the Agunah in American Society" (Praeger, July 20, 1993) 
"A Study of the Maryland Bar Exam" (January 1, 1988 Baltimore, Md.)
"Halakhic Approaches to the Resolution of Disputes Concerning the Disposition of Preembryos" (Vol. 31, No. 1, Halakhic Medical Issues (Fall 1996), pp. 64–91 Published By: Rabbinical Council of America (RCA). Published in Jewish Law and New Reproductive Technologies, Edited by Emanuel Feldman and Joel B. Wolowelsky. Hoboken, NJ, KTAV Pub. House, 1997. p. 155-186.) 
"New Developments in Consumer Bankruptcies: Chapter 7 Dismissal on the Basis of "Substanial Abuse"" (First Installment, Published in American Bankruptcy Law Journal, v. 59, no. 4, fall 1985, p. 327-355. (Second Installment, Published in American Bankruptcy Law Journal, v. 60, no. 1, winter 1986, p. 33-68.)
"Article 9 Security Interests as Voidable Preferences" (Published in Cardozo Law Review, v. 3, no. 3, spring 1982, p. 357-429. Part 2 of this paper - The Floating Lien - is published in Cardozo Law Review, v. 4, no. 1, fall 1982.
"The Brain Death Controversy in Jewish Law" (Published in the Jewish Action Reader, v. 1, 1996, p. 120-133. Reprinted with permission, 2006.)

See also

Ohr Somayach, Jerusalem

References

External links
Rabbibreitowitz.com
Breitowitz at Ohr Somayach

Harvard Law School alumni
Johns Hopkins University alumni
American Orthodox rabbis